Sugam Enge is a 1954 Indian Tamil-language romantic drama film, directed by K. Ramnoth and produced by Modern Theatres. The script was written by A. K. Velan and Kannadasan. Music was composed by the Viswanathan–Ramamoorthy duo. The film stars K. R. Ramasamy and Savitri. It was released on 9 September 1954.

Plot

Cast 
 K. R. Ramasamy as Velan
 Savitri as Veni
 P. S. Veerappa as Nagappan
 K. A. Thangavelu as Kannayiram
 R. Balasubramaniam as Velan's Father
 T. K. Ramachandran as Pandi Durai
 S. V. Subbaiah as Boopathy
 Chandrababu as Panjatcharam
 T. P. Muthulakshmi as Maragatham
 S. Rama Rao as Setji
 O. A. K. Thevar as Public Prosecutor
 K. Natarajan as Judge
 K. K. Soundar as Inspector

Soundtrack 
Music was composed by Viswanathan–Ramamoorthy and lyrics were written by Kannadasan and A. Maruthakasi.

Controversy 
There was a misunderstanding between Kannadasan and M. Karunanidhi with allegations that Sugam Enge had plagiarised Karunanidhi's Ammaiyappan. It was eventually declared that Sugam Enge was not based on Ammaiyappan, but a popular folk tale.

References

External links 
 

1950s Tamil-language films
1954 films
1954 romantic drama films
Films directed by K. Ramnoth
Films involved in plagiarism controversies
Films scored by Viswanathan–Ramamoorthy
Films shot in Puducherry
Indian black-and-white films
Indian romantic drama films